Osoe-dong is a dong, neighbourhood of Gangseo-gu in Seoul, South Korea. It is a legal dong (법정동 ) managed by its administrative dong (행정동 ), Gonghang-dong.

Asiana Airlines maintains its headquarters, Asiana Town, in Osoe-dong.

History
The name of the town originated from the fact that the region had five people who used to make iron crossbows in another place and took refuge.The region also had a sacred tree used for religious rituals.

From 1942, the Japanese constructed an airfield.
After independence the airfield became the Gimpo airport.

In 1992, the original inhabitants of the town left with some compensations from the government to use the land for the airport

See also 

Administrative divisions of South Korea

References

External links
Gangseo-gu official website
 Gangseo-gu map at the Gangseo-gu official website
 Resident offices of Gangseo-gu

Neighbourhoods of Gangseo District, Seoul